The Toy Retailers Association (formerly British Association of Toy Retailers) is a trade association that represents its members in the UK & Ireland. It promotes the role of the toy retailer and the value of toys to the consumer. It represents about 75% of the toy trade. It is based in Bodmin, Cornwall.

History

The Toy Retailers Association (TRA) was first established as the National Association of Toy Retailers in 1950 and changed its name first to the British Association of Toy Retailers (BATR) and then the Toy Retailers Association in 2005. It acts as both a watchdog and persuader to ensure fair play for toy retailers and represents the toy retail sector on government panels and safety organisations in the UK.

Awards
The association organises DreamToys, where the top 12 and top 72 toys for Christmas are chosen every November. The press-only event is held at St Mary's Church in Marylebone, London. The TRA also organises the Toy of the Year Awards, an event where the Toy of the Year award and other prizes are presented, including Toy Shop of the Year, Supplier of the Year and Multiple Retailer of the Year. The event is held on the first night of the UK Toy Fair at Olympia, London, each year in January.

Affiliated members
 Early Learning Centre
 Hamleys
 The Entertainer
 Smyths
 Toytown Stores
 Argos
 Toymaster

Toy of the Year

The Toy of the Year awards began in 1965 and are presented annually at an awarding dinner held during the British International Toy Fair at Olympia in January. The criteria are that the toy must have been very popular in the past year and excited interest among customers and retailers in the toy market.

 1965 - James Bond Aston Martin die-cast car
 1966 - Action Man (Palitoy)
 1967 - Spirograph (Denys Fisher)
 1968 - Sindy (Pedigree Toys)
 1969 - Hot Wheels
 1970 - Sindy
 1971 - Katie Kopykat writing doll
 1972 - Plasticraft modelling kits
 1973 - Mastermind board game
 1974 - Lego Family set
 1975 - Lego Basic set
 1976 - Peter Powell (kite)
 1977 - Playmobil Playpeople
 1978 - Combine Harvester (Britains Limited)
 1979 - Legoland Space kits
 1980 - Rubik's Cube
 1981 - Rubik's Cube
 1982 - Star Wars toys
 1983 - Star Wars toys
 1984 - Masters of the Universe
 1985 - Transformers (Optimus Prime)
 1986 - Transformers (Optimus Prime)
 1987 - Sylvanian Families
 1988 - Sylvanian Families
 1989 - Sylvanian Families
 1990 - Teenage Mutant Ninja Turtles
 1991 - Nintendo Game Boy
 1992 - WWF Wrestlers
 1993 - Thunderbirds Tracy Island
 1994 - Power Rangers
 1995 - Pogs
 1996 - Barbie
 1997 - Teletubbies
 1998 - Furby
 1999 - Furby Babies
 2000 - Teksta
 2001 - Bionicles (Lego)
 2002 - Beyblades
 2003 - Beyblades
 2004 - RoboSapien
 2005 - Tamagotchi Connexion
 2006 - Doctor Who Cyberman Mask
 2007 - In the Night Garden... Blanket Time Iggle Piggle
 2008 - Ben 10 Action Figures 10” and 15”
 2009 - Go Go Hamsters
 2010 - Jet Pack Buzz Lightyear
 2011 - LeapPad Explorer
 2012 - Furby
 2013 - Teksta
 2014 - Disney Frozen Snow Glow Elsa
 2015 - Pie Face
 2016 - Hatchimals
 2017 - L.O.L. Surprise
 2018 - L.O.L. Surprise
 2019 - L.O.L. Surprise! 2-in-1 Glamper Fashion Camper
 2020 - (No overall winner chosen due to COVID-19 pandemic)
 2021 - Barbie Day to Night Dreamhouse

References

External links
 Toy Retailers Association
 British Toy and Hobby Association

Trade associations based in the United Kingdom
Toy companies of the United Kingdom
Organisations based in Lincolnshire
Organizations established in 1950
Toy retailers of the United Kingdom
1950 establishments in the United Kingdom
Toy industry
Children's media and toys awards